Tearing Up the Album Chart is an album by the band Go-Kart Mozart.  It was released in 2005 on West Midland's Records, a subsidiary of Cherry Red. It was former Felt and Denim frontman Lawrence's second album under the alias Go Kart Mozart. Tracks 5, 8, 9 and 12 were originally recorded for the unreleased Denim album Denim Take Over.

In 2019, Lawrence announced his dissatisfaction with the album, stating it was a collection of demos that were issued during a rough period in his life, and that he plans to remix and re-record the album under the title Renovating The Album Charts.

Track listing
All songs written by Lawrence.
"Glorious Chorus" - 2:26 
"Summer Is Here" - 3:25
"Electric Rock & Roll" - 3:45
"Listening to Marmalade" - 3:05 
"At the DDU" - 2:15
"On a Building Site" - 2:01 
"Fuzzy Duck" - 4:43 
"Transgressions" - 1:44
"Delta Echo Echo Beta Alpha Neon Kettle" - 1:56 
"Donna & the Dopefiends" - 2:48 
"England & Wales" - 1:40 
"City Centre" - 3:43

References

2005 albums
Go-Kart Mozart albums